The Czech national identity card (citizen card, literally civic certificate) is the identity document used in the Czech Republic (and formerly in Czechoslovakia), in addition to the Czech passport. It is issued to all citizens, and every person above 15 years of age permanently living in the Czech Republic is required by law to hold a valid identity card.

It is possible to use the ID card instead of a passport for travel within European Union or Schengen Area and to some other European states (Albania, Bosnia and Herzegovina, Montenegro, Georgia, North Macedonia, Moldova, and Serbia), but not to Belarus, Russia, Ukraine, United Kingdom, and Montserrat.

History

The first mandatory identity document was introduced during the German occupation, on 17 March 1939 in a decree made by Reichsprotektor Konstantin von Neurath. This document was based on the model of a similar document already in use in the Third Reich and included a photograph. Known as a legitimace, it was often nicknamed kennkarta.

During the communist regime (1948–89) this simple card developed into a booklet dozens of pages long. It contained such personal details as employment history and vaccination records.

Requirements
To acquire the machine-readable version of the card, a citizen must present either a currently valid card (in case of renewals), or a currently valid passport, or a birth certificate and proof of citizenship. A photograph is made at the premises of the issuing authority; the form is filled out by an employee of the issuing authority and only requires the signature of the applicant.

To acquire the non-machine-readable version, a citizen must present a filled out application, two photographs, and either a currently valid card (in case of renewals) or a birth certificate and proof of citizenship.

Photograph
The photograph must be , depict the current appearance of the individual in civilian clothes, show the person looking forwards with the distance from the eyes to the chin at least , without dark glasses (except the blind), without any head cover (except for health or religious reasons, which may not cover the face in a way that makes the person difficult to distinguish). The photograph must be smooth.

The person on the photo is required to have their eyes opened, mouth closed and keep their facial expression neutral.

Data included

Front side
 Card ID
 Surname
 First name
 Date of birth
 Nationality (Česká republika)
 Date of expiration

Reverse
 Place of birth
 Identity number
 Permanent address
 Birth name
 Other data
 Issuing authority and date of issue

The following information is printed if requested by the applicant (who must provide proof if necessary):

 Academic degree (issued until 2021 new design).

The following information is printed unless the applicant explicitly opts out:

 Marital status/Registered partnership

The top left (A) and top right (B) corners may be cut off. The top left (A) corner is cut off in case of permanent stay change. The top right (B) corner is cut off in case of any other personal data change (name, surname, sex, marital status etc.). A yellow piece of paper stating what information have changed should be presented with the identity card until a new identity card with correct data is issued. The identity card with one of those corners cut off is still a valid identity card.

Contactless chip
 Two fingerprints
 Color photograph

The contactless chip follows the ICAO standard for biometric passports and is only present on cards issued from August 2021.

See also
 National identity cards in the European Union
 Czech passport

References

External links
 The Ministerstvo Vnitra page on občanský průkaz 

Identity card
Czechia